In some programming languages such as C (and its close descendants like C++, Objective-C, and Java), static is a reserved word controlling both lifetime (as a static variable) and visibility (depending on linkage). The effect of the keyword varies depending on the details of the specific programming language.

Common C/C++ behavior
In C and C++, the effect of the static keyword in C depends on where the declaration occurs.

static may act as a storage class (not to be confused with classes in object-oriented programming), as can extern, auto and register (which are also reserved words). Every variable and function has one of these storage classes; if a declaration does not specify the storage class, a context-dependent default is used:
extern for all top-level declarations in a source file,
auto for variables declared in function bodies.

In these languages, the term "static variable" has two meanings which are easy to confuse:
 A variable with the same lifetime as the program, as described above (language-independent); or
 (C-family-specific) A variable declared with storage class static.
Variables with storage class extern, which include variables declared at top level without an explicit storage class, are static in the first meaning but not the second.

Static global variable
A variable declared as static at the top level of a source file (outside any function definitions) is only visible throughout that file ("file scope", also known as "internal linkage"). In this usage, the keyword static is known as an "access specifier".

Static function
Similarly, a static functiona function declared as static at the top level of a source file (outside any class definitions)is only visible throughout that file ("file scope", also known as "internal linkage").

Static local variables
Variables declared as static inside a function are statically allocated, thus keep their memory location throughout all program execution, while having the same scope of visibility as automatic local variables (auto and register), meaning they remain local to the function. Hence whatever values the function puts into its static local variables during one call will still be present when the function is called again.

C++ specific

Static member variables 
In C++, member variables declared as static inside class definitions are class variables (shared between all class instances, as opposed to instance variables).

Static method
Similarly, a static methoda method declared as static inside a class definitionis meant to be relevant to all instances of a class rather than any specific instance. A method declared as static can be called without instantiating the class.

Java
This keyword static means that this method is now a class method; it will be called through class name rather than through an object.

A static method is normally called as <classname>.methodname(), whereas an instance method is normally called as  <objectname>.methodname().

See also

C (programming language)
 C++
 Java (programming language)